Aquiloeurycea is a genus of salamanders in the family Plethodontidae. They are endemic to Mexico. The genus corresponds to the former "Pseudoeurycea cephalica species group", which was established in order to preserve Ixalotriton and Bolitoglossa while avoiding paraphyly of Pseudoeurycea.

Species
It contains the following species:

Gallery

References

 
Amphibians of North America
Endemic amphibians of Mexico
Amphibian genera